Robert Sheehan  (born 7 January 1988) is an Irish actor. He is best known for television roles such as Nathan Young in Misfits, Darren Treacy in Love/Hate, and Klaus Hargreeves in The Umbrella Academy, as well as film roles such as Tom Natsworthy in Mortal Engines and Simon Lewis in The Mortal Instruments: City of Bones.

Sheehan has received multiple Irish Film and Television Award nominations and a British Academy Television Award nomination. In 2020, he was listed as number 41 on The Irish Times list of Ireland's greatest film actors.

Early life
Sheehan was born in Portlaoise, County Laois. He is the youngest of three children born to Maria and Joe Sheehan, who was a garda.

At school, he played the banjo, the bodhrán, and the spoons, having joked that he was like "Footloose with spoons"; he also participated in Fleadh Cheoil.

Sheehan attended St Paul's school in Portlaoise. Unsure of whether acting was a sustainable career choice, he studied film and television at Galway-Mayo Institute of Technology. He missed several months of the course to film Summer of the Flying Saucer, and failed his first year examinations, and decided not to attempt the repeats.

Career
Sheehan became interested in acting in primary school, when he played Oliver in Oliver with a Twist. At the age of fourteen, he auditioned for Song for a Raggy Boy, and won the role, spending three months in Cork to film. He later joined the Laois Open Door theatre group, and played the crippled boy in a production of The Cripple of Inishmaan. At the age of 16, Sheehan appeared in the Australian television show Foreign Exchange. He followed it with roles in The Clinic and The Tudors, and portrayed Louis XIV of France in Young Blades. In 2008, he appeared in Rock Rivals and Bitter Sweet, a two-part television comedy drama. During this time, he also appeared in films including Ghostwood.

After leaving the Galway-Mayo Institute of Technology, Sheehan starred as one of the lead characters in the Cherrybomb in 2009. In March 2009, he appeared in the role of BJ in the Channel 4 trilogy Red Riding. Sheehan described the role as "weighty" and a "step up" from his previous work, and credits the show with changing his career.

From 2009 to 2010, he starred as Nathan Young, a young offender, in the first two series of the British TV series Misfits. In April 2011, it was announced that Sheehan would not be returning to the show for the third season. Regarded as a "cult favourite", Sheehan connected "intensely" with the role, which he later described as "defining", and "a lovely, gorgeous memory for me," and remarked it was "challenging" to leave it behind. In May 2011 he was nominated for a BAFTA Award in the "Male Supporting Actor" category for his role in Misfits. Beginning in 2010, he played Darren, a member of gangland Dublin in Love/Hate. He accepted the part because he wanted to work with Stuart Carolan and Dave Caffrey, and featured in three seasons. After leaving the series, his character's ubiquitous blue hoodie was donated to the Dunamaise Theater in Portlaoise, and he remarked it was "tough to watch [the] show carry on without [me]". He was nominated for an Irish Film and Television Award for the role in 2011 and 2013. In 2011, Sheehan played Kay in Season of the Witch alongside Nicolas Cage and Ron Perlman.

Sheehan was nominated for an Irish Film and Television Award in the Rising Star category in 2010. The following year, he starred in the film Killing Bono, and in John Crowley's production of The Playboy of the Western World at the Old Vic Theatre. Sheehan appeared in the second season of the BBC crime drama series Accused, which aired in 2012. He played Simon Lewis in the 2013 film The Mortal Instruments: City of Bones, and followed it with roles in Anita B., The Road Within, Moonwalkers, and The Messenger in 2014 and 2015. In late 2015, he played Richard III in Trevor Nunn's revival of The Wars of the Roses, an adaption of William Shakespeare's plays Richard III and the three part Henry VI. In a 2018 interview with Hot Press, Sheehan described the role as his recent favourite, citing the "magic" and "transcendent experience" of being on stage.

The Song of Sway Lake premiered at the Los Angeles Film Festival in 2017, and was released theatrically the following year. It was filmed prior to 2014, and reflecting on the role in 2019, Sheehan described himself as "immensely proud". During 2017, he also appeared in Geostorm and featured in the second season of Fortitude, for which he was nominated for an Irish Film and Television Award. In 2018, he appeared in Genius: Picasso as Carlos Casagemas and in The Young Offenders Christmas special as a caricatured version of himself. He also appeared in several films; he starred alongside David Tennant in Bad Samaritan, appeared in the neo-noir film Mute, and starred in Mortal Engines in the leading role of Tom Natsworthy.

In 2019, he starred in the Netflix Original series The Umbrella Academy as Klaus Hargreeves.

On 15 October 2021, Robert published his debut novel, Disappearing Act: A Host of Other Characters in 16 Short Stories.

Personal life
Sheehan resides in London. He has also lived in Los Angeles.

He has spoken openly about experimenting with his sexuality when younger, but identifies as heterosexual.

He was in a relationship with actress Sofia Boutella from March 2014 until October 2018.

Filmography

Film

Television

Awards and honours
In September 2013, Sheehan was honoured by University College Dublin's Literary and Historical Society. In October 2015, he received the Burke Medal for Contribution to Discourse Through The Arts from College Historical Society in Trinity College Dublin.

References

External links

Irish male film actors
Irish male stage actors
Irish male television actors
21st-century Irish male actors
People from Portlaoise
Actors from County Laois
Living people
Irish expatriates in England
1988 births